The Slingsby T.29 Motor Tutor was a single-seat motor glider produced from 1948, by Slingsby Sailplanes in Kirbymoorside, Yorkshire.

Design and development
Utilising the wings, struts and tail unit of the T.8 Kirby Tutor, the T.29 Motor Tutor had a new fuselage incorporating a wheeled undercarriage and the cockpit under the wing centre section. Early trials revealed resonance of the front wing struts, which was rectified by adding a vertical bracing strut up to the main spar. This modification was introduced for all Kirby Tutors to allow aero-tow launching.

Development
Two versions of the T.29 Motor Tutor were produced, T.29A with a 25h.p. Scott Flying Squirrel engine and the T.29B with a 40 h.p. Aeronca JAP J.99. Both of these versions flew successfully but considerable difficulty was had certificating the aircraft with the Air Registration Board, which precluded production. The T.29A was exported and the T.29B crashed at Dunstable in 1964. In 1966 an additional T.29 was discovered by R.G. Boyton at Epsom in Surrey, and is stored pending restoration.

Specifications (T.29B)

See also

References

 Bridgman, Leonard. Jane's All The World's Aircraft 1952–53. London: Sampson Low, Marston & Company, Ltd, 1952.
 Ellison, N.H. British Gliders and Sailplanes 1922–1970. A & C Black, 1971
 Simons, M. Slingsby Sailplanes. Airlife Publishing, 1996 - 

1940s British sailplanes
Motor gliders
Motor Tutor
Parasol-wing aircraft
Single-engined tractor aircraft
Aircraft first flown in 1948